Frösakull is a locality situated in Halmstad Municipality, Halland County, Sweden, with 1,635 inhabitants in 2010, and it's named after the Norse god, Freyr.

References 

Populated places in Halmstad Municipality